Berhala Strait is a strait which separates the island of Sumatra and Singkep in the South China Sea, Indonesia.

Berhala island in the strait, attribution has been contested by Riau Islands and Jambi province.

See also
 List of straits

Notes

Straits of Indonesia
Landforms of Sumatra
Straits of the South China Sea